USS Anchorage (LPD-23) is a  and the second ship of the United States Navy to be namesake of the U.S. city of Anchorage, Alaska.

Construction
Anchorages keel was laid down on 24 September 2007, at the Avondale Shipyard near New Orleans, Louisiana, then owned by Northrop Grumman Ship Systems. The ship was launched on 12 February 2011.; sponsored by Mrs. Annette Conway, wife of James T. Conway, a former Commandant of the Marine Corps. She was christened two months later, on 14 May – the first ship christened by Huntington Ingalls Industries since Northrop Grumman spun off its shipbuilding divisions as a separate company.
The ship was formally delivered and accepted by the U.S. Navy on 17 September 2012.
Anchorage was commissioned 4 May 2013, in her eponymous city.

Service history

Deployments

11 May 2015 – 15 December 2015. Maiden Deployment
10 July 2018 – 1 March 2019 western pacific

Recovering Orion space capsules for NASA

In early August 2014, Anchorage participated in Underway Recovery Test 2, rehearsing scenarios for recovering an Orion space capsule.

Senior project managers from the National Aeronautics and Space Administration (NASA), who oversaw the Exploration Flight Test 1 (EFT-1) for the uncrewed Orion spacecraft, conferred with Rear Admiral Fernandez L. Ponds, commander Expeditionary Strike Group (ESG) 3, and Captain William R. Grotewold, the ship's commanding officer, on board  at her home port of San Diego, 12 September 2013. They discussed plans to retrieve Orion's space capsule during her splashdown in a scheduled test off the coast of Southern California.

"We had a chance to display the ship's capability, show the crew's enthusiasm and demonstrate that our amphibious capability is multi-dimensional, just one more thing that our Navy can do," Ponds explained. "The LPD 17-class ships have one of the most robust command and control communications systems in our Navy inventory."

The flight was to test the capsule's avionics, heat shield, and parachutes, and the Navy was tasked to locate and recover the craft.

"NASA did a trade study whether they wanted Orion to land on the ground or in the water," Andy Quiett, Detachment 3 deputy operations lead for the Orion program and Department of Defense (DoD) liaison for NASA said, "and because of the size, weight and the deep space requirements of the vehicle, they determined it needed to land in water." Orion's life support, propulsion, thermal protection, and avionics systems enable the spacecraft to extend the duration of her deep space missions, as part of the goal to eventually land on Mars.

NASA marked a major milestone in the agency's program to reestablish America's crewed space program when it carried out EFT-1 with Orion on 5 December 2014. Orion launched atop a Delta IV rocket from Space Launch Complex 37B at the Cape Canaveral Air Force Station, Florida, made two orbits of the planet during a four and a half hour mission, and splashed down in the Pacific. Anchorage, Military Sealift Command-crewed salvage ship , Helicopter Sea Combat Squadron 8 (HSC-8), EODMU-11, Mobile Diving and Salvage Company 11–17, Fleet Weather Center San Diego, and Fleet Combat Camera Pacific took part in the recovery when the spacecraft splashed down. Anchorage recovered Orion's crew module, forward bay cover, and parachutes. A bridge team especially trained for the operation maneuvered Anchorage alongside Orion, and lowered small boats to retrieve her. Divers attached lines from the small boats to guide the capsule toward Anchorage, where a NASA-designed winch hauled the module into the well deck.

References

External links 

 Official Web Site: USS Anchorage
      pms317.navy.mil: USS Anchorage

 

San Antonio-class amphibious transport docks
2011 ships
Space capsule recovery ships